Mark Joseph Peake (born January 19, 1963) is a member of the Virginia Senate, representing the 22nd district. A member of the Republican Party, he won a special election held on January 10, 2017, to succeed Tom Garrett Jr., who had been elected to the United States House of Representatives.

Electoral history

References

Living people
1963 births
Virginia Tech alumni
Washington and Lee University School of Law alumni
Politicians from Greensboro, North Carolina
Politicians from Lynchburg, Virginia
21st-century American politicians
Republican Party Virginia state senators